Mehdiyeh (also Romanized as Mehdīyeh; also known as Zāneyān Pā’īn, Zānīān, Zānīān-e Pā’īn, and Zānīyān) is a village in Howmeh Rural District, in the Central District of Shahrekord County, Chaharmahal and Bakhtiari Province, Iran. At the 2006 census, its population was 6,232, in 1,519 families.

References 

Populated places in Shahr-e Kord County